Gorzów Wielkopolski Wieprzyce railway station is a railway station serving the town of Gorzów Wielkopolski, in the Lubusz Voivodeship, Poland. The station opened in 1912 and is located on the Tczew–Kostrzyn railway and Gorzów Wielkopolski–Myślibórz railway. The train services are operated by Przewozy Regionalne and Arriva.

Train services
The station is served by the following service(s):

Regional services (R) Kostrzyn - Gorzow Wielkopolski - Krzyz (- Poznan)

References

 This article is based upon a translation of the Polish language version as of November 2016.

External links

Railway stations in Poland opened in 1912
Railway stations in Gorzów Wielkopolski
Railway stations in Lubusz Voivodeship